{{Speciesbox
| image = Arya-Phyllanthus reticulatus - ileng-ileng dawat - Pilangsari 2019 5.jpg
| image_caption = Leaves and flowers 
| image2 = Arya-Phyllanthus reticulatus - ileng-ileng dawat - Pilangsari 2019 1.jpg
| image2_caption = Fruit
| genus = Phyllanthus
| species = reticulatus
| authority = Poir.
| range_map = 
| range_map_caption =
| synonyms_ref = 
| synonyms = 
{{Collapsible list
| Anisonema dubium Blume
| Anisonema intermedium Decne.
| Anisonema jamaicense  (Griseb.) Griseb.
| Anisonema multiflorum  (Baill.) Wight
| Anisonema puberulum Baill.
| Anisonema reticulatum (Poir.) A.Juss.
| Anisonema wrightianum Baill.
| Anisonema zollingeri Miq.
| Cicca decandra Blanco
| Cicca reticulata (Poir.) Kurz
| Diasperus multiflorus  (Baill.) Kuntze
| Diasperus reticulatus (Poir.) Kuntze
| Kirganelia dubia  (Blume) Baill.
| Kirganelia intermedia  (Decne.) Baill.
| Kirganelia lineata Alston
| Kirganelia multiflora Baill.
| Kirganelia prieuriana Baill.
| Kirganelia puberula Baill.
| Kirganelia reticulata (Poir.) Baill.
| Kirganelia sinensis Baill.
| Kirganelia wightiana Baill.
| Melanthesa oblongifolia Oken
| Phyllanthus alaternoides Rchb. ex Baill.
| Phyllanthus chamissonis Klotzsch
| Phyllanthus dalbergioides  (Müll.Arg.) Wall. ex J.J.Sm.
| Phyllanthus depressus Buch.-Ham. ex Dillwyn [Illegitimate]
| Phyllanthus griseus Wall. [Invalid]
| Phyllanthus jamaicensis Griseb.
| Phyllanthus microcarpus var. dalbergioides Müll.Arg.
| Phyllanthus microcarpus var. pallidus Müll.Arg.
| Phyllanthus multiflorus Willd. [Illegitimate]
| Phyllanthus oblongifolius Pax
| Phyllanthus pentandrus Roxb. ex Thwaites [Illegitimate]
| Phyllanthus prieurianus  (Baill.) Müll.Arg.
| Phyllanthus puberulus Miq. ex Baill.
| Phyllanthus pulchellus A. Juss.
| Phyllanthus reticulatus var. reticulatus 
| Phyllanthus scandens Roxb. ex Dillwyn
| Phyllanthus spinescens Wall. [Invalid]
| Phyllanthus takaoensis Hayata
 }}
}}Phyllanthus reticulatus is a plant species described Jean Louis Marie Poiret; it is included in the family Phyllanthaceae.

This is an Asian species of Phyllanthus (but it was also introduced to Jamaica); it has been confused with P. polyspermus.  In Vietnamese its name is phèn đen (sometimes diệp hạ châu mạng). It is also found in Northern Australia,  where the aborigines of the Moyle River area use the wood for firesticks and call it Mirrinymirriny.Phyllanthus reticulatus is pollinated by several different species of Epicephala in East Asia. The adult moths pollinate the flowers but lay eggs in the P. reticulatus flowers' ovaries, where the emerging larvae consume some of the developing seeds.

Subspecies
The following subspecies are listed in the Catalogue of Life:
 Phyllanthus reticulatus var. glaber (Thwaites) Müll.Arg.
 P. r. reticulatus (see synonyms)

DescriptionPhyllanthus reticulatus'' is a shrub, sometimes partially scrambling and usually only up to 5 m high, with light reddish-brown or grey-brown with hairy stems when young, which become smooth with age.  For a full description see Flora of China and the gallery below.

Gallery

References

External links
Phyllanthus reticulatus occurrence data from GBIF
 
 

reticulatus
Flora of China
Flora of tropical Asia